A spirit child in Ghana is a disabled child who is believed to possess magical powers to cause misfortune.  Disability in Ghana is greatly stigmatized and the only way considered acceptable to deal with the problem is to kill them via advice by a witchdoctor. Spirit children are referred to as chichuru or kinkiriko in the Kassena-Nankana district in Northern Ghana. These children primarily come from poor, rural areas. However, if a spirit child is known to be "good" there are no punishments for the child or their family.

Similar practices are also occurring in other places in sub-Saharan Africa. Similar practices include "witch babies in Benin, snake children in Mali and the Ivory Coast, spirit children in Guinea-Bissau, and mingi children in Tanzania".

Causes

Physical characteristics 
Birth abnormalities that spirit children exhibit are large or small heads, spina bifida, premature teeth and broken limbs. The cause of a spirit child may also be from crop failure or the death of a livestock. Intentional killing of a totem animal can also cause the spirit of the animal to jump into the human being.

Disabilities and illnesses 
Spirit children often have disabilities or chronic illnesses. If the mother is sick during pregnancy, the child may also perceived to be a spirit child. If a child refuses to eat, they may also be a spirit child. This "refusal to thrive" indicates that the child may be a spirit masquerading as a child. Families fear their child as there is little information about the truths of the practice. Families also believe that once a spirit child is born they will destroy the family's home.

Attracting spirits 
It is believed that women can attract a spirit if they walk while they eat. These spirits are attracted to human food and will enter the woman’s womb, impregnating them. Actions that attract spirits include “using unapproved entrances and exits to a house, washing another woman’s calabashes at the riverside, and bathing at night”. Many people also regard series of still births to be same child returning. When this occurs, the child is mutilated with a razor blade so that the same child cannot return.

Community response 
Members of the community describe spirit children as "impulsive, wise, crafty, and mischievous." Community members also note that the spirit children often have malnutrition. Among all ethnic groups, women are more likely than men to have witchcraft beliefs.

Treating spirit children

Religious beliefs 
Strong religious beliefs encourage these practices. It is believed that these children do not deserve a place among humans. Sentiments of infant alterity explain the cultural psychodynamics of parents killing their children. The actions taken to kill the spirit is based on religious beliefs.

Preparing the concoction 
Spirit children are treated by concoction men. The family seeks out a concoction man to treat the spirit child with a dongo. The men prepare a tea or herbal infusion, as known as a "bunbunlia". Inside of the dongo, there is "black medicine" that the men add to tea. The black medicine is composed of a burnt or charred herbs that are mixed with shea butter.

Administering the concoction 
An elder woman in the child’s family typically administers the concoction rather than the concoction man. Following the death of the child, "the concoction man wraps it in an old sleeping mat, disposes of the body in the bush, and conducts a ceremony to ensure that it does not return to torment the family". The concoction sends the spirit back to the bush since the spirit children were believed to be spirit bushes impersonating humans. The bush is an undomesticated forest space. Other sources say that the disabled children return to the world of their ancestors. Abuse of these disabled children include social, capital, physical and emotional abuse.

Government response

Birth registration 
The practice was criminalized in Ghana in 2013, yet is still widely practiced due to the lack of birth registration. Deaths are often not recorded, so the occurrence of murdering spirit children is unable to be known. One study suggests that between 22-27% of infant mortalities are attributed to spirit children practices. A study conducted by the University of Alberta Ethics Review Board and the NHRC Institutional Review Board, found that 36% of the death of spirit children are due to natural causes, including post-mortem deaths. Rights of the child are not guaranteed without a birth certificate since they are not legally registered.

Advancements 
Ghana passed the Registration of Births and Deaths Act of 1965 requiring all births and deaths to be registered. Its goal is to “provide accurate and reliable information on all births and deaths occurring within Ghana for socio-economic development of the country through their registration and certification”. Birth registration still remains a problem since rural areas since there are less registration offices and staff in rural areas. According to information from 2014 Ghana Demographic and Health Survey, the births of 28.89% children in Ghana have never been registered. This rate is the lowest among children born to young mothers, those without formal education and mothers living in rural areas.

Advocacy 
In 1991, Ben Okri published the book The Famished Road. This book brought attention to the practice of killing spirit children. In 2013, Anas Aremeyaw Anas, an undercover reporter set out to find the people responsible for the practices.  Christianization also has helped limit the occurrence of spirit children practices.

AfriKids is a child rights Non-governmental organization that has created education programs about the practice of spirit children. Since 2002, AfriKids has ended the practices in 58 communities and preventing about 243 deaths. Joe Asakibeem works with AfriKids. Concoction men, mothers and elderly women in the child's family are given payments from AfriKids for them to stop the practice.

See also 
 Prayer camps
 Albinism
 Changeling
 Kassena-Nankana District
 The Famished Road
 Witchcraft in Ghana

References

Disability in Ghana
Spiritualism
Religion in Ghana
Modern witch hunts
African witchcraft
Conspiracy theories in Africa